|}

The For Auction Novice Hurdle is a Grade 3 National Hunt novice hurdle race in Ireland which is open to horses aged four years or older. It is run at Navan over a distance of about 2 miles (3,218 metres). The race is scheduled to take place each year in November.

The race was first run in 1997, and was awarded Grade 3 status in 2003.

Records
Leading jockey  (4 wins):
 Barry Geraghty – Aunt Aggie (2000), O'Muircheartaigh (2005), Clopf (2006), Academy Sir Harry (2008)

Leading trainer  (5 wins):
 Edward O'Grady – Go Roger Go (1997), Aunt Aggie (2000), O'Muircheartaigh (2005), Clopf (2006), Judge Roy Bean (2009)

Winners

See also
 Horse racing in Ireland
 List of Irish National Hunt races

References
Racing Post:
.

National Hunt hurdle races
National Hunt races in Ireland
Navan Racecourse